René Dohet (born 8 November 1907, date of death unknown) was a former Belgian footballer and coach.

Honours as player
 Runners-up in Belgian First Division in the 1926/1927 season and the 1927/1928 season.

References

External links
 Page of René Dohet

Belgian footballers
Standard Liège players
Belgian football managers
Standard Liège managers
1907 births
Year of death missing
Association football midfielders